The following is a list of Good News Week spin-off series episodes.

Good News Year (1997)
Hosted by Paul McDermott, this show aired on 31 December 1997.

Good News Weekend (1998)

Good News Year- Eastern Version (1998)

Special guest appearances were made during the show by Tanya Bulmer and Rod Quantock

Good News Year- Western Version (1998)

With special guest appearances from Anthony Morgan, Adam Spencer

Good News Week NightLite (1999)

Good News Week Debates (1999–2000)

Good News Week: The Closing Ceremony (2000)

Good News World (2011) 
Paul McDermott, Mikey Robins, Claire Hooper, Cal Wilson, Akmal, Sammy J, Randy, and Tom Gleeson appear in every episode.

References
 "GNW Episode Guide" (1998). Retrieved 25 August 2009.

Criticism of journalism
Lists of Australian non-fiction television series episodes
Lists of Australian comedy television series episodes